This is a list of Gujarati language films that released in 2016.

Releases

January – March

April – June

July – September

October – December

References

External links
 List of Gujarati films of 2016 at the Internet Movie Database

2016
Gujarati
Gujarati